Sykes Enterprises, Inc., stylized as SYKES, is an American multinational business process outsourcing provider headquartered in Tampa, Florida. The company provides business process outsourcing (BPO) services, IT consulting, and IT-enabled services, such as technical support and customer service.

History
Sykes was founded in 1977 by John H. Sykes in Charlotte, North Carolina to provide engineering and design services to large corporations. Companies such as IBM, AT&T, and Texas Instruments were among Sykes' first clients. By 1990, the company had 1,000 employees, 20 offices, and $55 million in annual revenue.

In 1992, the company moved into the customer service business by purchasing Jones Technologies, a call center company based in Sterling, Colorado.

In 1993, Sykes relocated its corporate headquarters from Charlotte to Tampa, Florida.

Sykes became a publicly traded company in 1996. The company was listed on NASDAQ under the stock symbol SYKE.

David Grimes, a former AT&T executive, was named president of Sykes in 1998. John Sykes remained CEO and chairman. In 2000, Grimes became president and CEO. However, after 3 months, Grimes resigned and Sykes returned as president and CEO.

Charles Sykes, John Sykes' son, became president and CEO of the company in 2004. Charles had been with the company 17 years prior to assuming his father's position.

On June 18, 2021, a subsidiary of Sitel Group acquired all outstanding shares of Sykes shares in a cash transaction valued at approximately $2.2 billion, removing the company from Nasdaq's publicly traded company. The Sitel Group, in its new combination, brings together 160,000 employees in 40 countries, serving more than 700 customers and in more than 50 languages. This merger will enable the company to achieve revenue of approximately $4.3 billion in 2021.

Acquisitions 
In 1992 Sykes purchased Jones Technologies, Inc. in Sterling, Colorado and enters into customer support business. Four years later Sykes acquired Datasvar Support AB of Sweden and Diagsoft Inc. of Scotts Valley, California and one year later McQueen International Limited as well as the German company Telcare. In 2006, Sykes acquired Argentina-based Apex America and in 2010 ICT Group. In 2012, Sykes purchased Alpine Access and three years later a company called Qelp. In 2016, Sykes acquired Clearlink from Utah and two years later the Robotic process automation service provider Symphony Ventures. In 2020, Sykes carried out its last acquisition before being acquired by the Sitel Group in 2021. It purchased Taylor Media Corp. (TMC), a personal finance digital media company and owner of The Penny Hoarder.

References

External links

Companies based in Tampa, Florida
Business process outsourcing companies of the United States
Call centre companies
Companies formerly listed on the Nasdaq
Business services companies established in 1977
Multinational companies headquartered in the United States
Technology companies based in Florida
1996 initial public offerings
2021 mergers and acquisitions